Below is a list of squads used in the 1972 African Cup of Nations.

Group A

Cameroon
Coach:  Peter Schnittger
|

Kenya
Coach:  Eckhard Krautzun
|

Mali
Coach:  Karl-Heinz Weigang
|

Togo
Coach:  Gottlieb Göller
|

Group B

Congo
Coach:  Adolphe "Amoyen" Bibandzoulou
|

Morocco
Coach:  Sabino Barinaga 
|

Sudan
Coach: Abdel-Fattah Hamad Abu-Zeid
|

Zaire
Coach: Blagoje Vidinić 
|

External links
African Nations Cup 1972 - RSSSF
8ème édition : le Congo Brazzaville crée la sensation
Gor Mahia in the 1970s
CAN 1972
Congo squad 1972
Sadia Cissé

Africa Cup of Nations squads
Squads